Al Qara is one of the governorates in Al Bahah Region, Saudi Arabia.

References 

Populated places in Al-Bahah Province
Governorates of Saudi Arabia